Mesentea may refer to several places in Romania:

Mesentea village, Galda de Jos Commune, Alba County
Ady Endre village, Căuaș Commune, Satu Mare County, formerly called Mesentea